Carl James Kunasek is an American retired politician who served as a member of the Arizona House of Representatives and the Arizona Senate. From 1994 to 2001, he was chair of the Arizona Corporation Commission.

Early life and education
Kunasek was born in 1932. He graduated from Creighton University.

Career
Kunasek was first elected to the House of Representatives in 1972. He was re-elected in 1974, 1976, 1978 and 1980. Kunasek was then a member of the Senate from 1983 to 1989, serving as President of the Senate from 1987 to 1989. He was defeated for re-election in the Republican primary in 1988 by Jerry Gillespie. In 1994, Kunasek was elected to head the Arizona Corporation Commission and remained in the position until 2001.

References

|-

|-

|-

Presidents of the Arizona Senate
Republican Party Arizona state senators
Republican Party members of the Arizona House of Representatives
Creighton University alumni
1932 births
Living people